Tymanivka is a village in Ukraine in the Tulchyn district of Vinnytsia region.

The KOATUU is 0524386201. The population Census of 2001 registered 1942 people. Its Postal Code is 23644. Telephone code is 4335.
It encompasses an area of 4.98 square kilometers.

Attractions
 Suvorov Museum

References

 Тимановка на сайте Верховной рады Украины 
Tulchyn Raion

Villages in Tulchyn Raion